Mauricio may refer to:

Mauricio (given name)
Maurício José da Silveira Júnior (born 1988), Brazilian footballer known by the mononym Maurício
Maurício (footballer) (Maurício dos Santos Nascimento, born 1988), Brazilian footballer
216428 Mauricio